Alexandre "Alex" Welter (born 30 June 1953) is a Brazilian sailor and Olympic champion. He won a gold medal in the Tornado Class at the 1980 Summer Olympics in Moscow, alongside Lars Sigurd Bjorkstrom.

References

External links
 
 
 
 

1953 births
Living people
Brazilian male sailors (sport)
Olympic sailors of Brazil
Olympic medalists in sailing
Olympic gold medalists for Brazil
Sailors at the 1980 Summer Olympics – Tornado
Medalists at the 1980 Summer Olympics
Brazilian people of German descent